The melon butterflyfish (Chaetodon trifasciatus) or the Indian redfin butterflyfish, is a species of marine ray-finned fish, a butterflyfish belonging to the family Chaetodontidae. It is found in the Indian Ocean from East Africa to Western Java. This is one species of a closely related group which includes the blacktail butterflyfish (C. austriacus) of the Red Sea and Gulf of Aden and the oval butterflyfish (C. lunulatus) which is found in the western Pacific, from eastern coasts of the Indonesian islands to Australia.

Melon butterflyfish should not to be confused with chevron butterflyfish (C. trifascialis), three-striped butterflyfish (C. tricinctus), or three-banded butterflyfish (C. robustus).

Description and characteristics
The oval butterflyfish and the blacktail butterflyfish resemble C. trifasciatus in coloration. The former has a less conspicuous back patch below the dorsal fin and a mainly dark anal fin, while the latter has black caudal and anal fins.

Melon, black-tailed and oval butterflyfishes and probably also the somewhat aberrant Arabian butterflyfish (C. melapterus) make up the subgenus Corallochaetodon, of which C. trifasciatus is the type species. They are probably quite close to the subgenus called "Citharoedus" (that name is a junior homonym of a mollusc genus), which contains for example the scrawled butterflyfish (C. meyeri). Like that group, they might be separated in Megaprotodon if the genus Chaetodon is split up.

Habitat and range
The melon butterflyfish is found in the Indian Ocean from East Africa to Western Java, at depths between 2 and 20 m, in coral-rich lagoons and semi-protected seaward reefs.  Small juveniles are secretive and hide in corals.

Ecology and behaviour
Growing to a maximum of 15 cm long, the monogamous adults swim in pairs and may be territorial and aggressive to other Chaetodon. Melon butterflyfish feed exclusively on coral polyps, particularly of Pocillopora. They are oviparous.

References

External links
 

melon butterflyfish
Fish of Madagascar
Fish of the Indian Ocean
melon butterflyfish